The Chinese Revolution can refer to:
1911 Revolution or Xinhai Revolution: the October 10, 1911 uprising against the Qing Dynasty and establishment of the Republic of China in 1912.
Second Revolution (Republic of China), the 1913 rebellion against Yuan Shikai
Constitutional Protection Movement, also known as the "Third Revolution", the movement led by Sun Yat Sen to resist the Beiyang government from 1917 to 1922
Northern Expedition, a military campaign by Chiang Kai-shek's Nationalist forces against the Beiyang government in 1926–28, leading to the establishment of the Nationalist government in Nanking.
Chinese Civil War, the conflict between the Nationalist government and the Communists from 1927 to 1949
Chinese Communist Revolution, the victory of the Chinese Communist Party in the final stage of the Chinese Civil War in 1949
Cultural Revolution, a sociopolitical purge movement led by Mao Zedong against capitalist and traditionalist elements of Chinese society from 1966 to 1976

See also
List of rebellions in China
Boxer Rebellion